The Bharatiya Janata Party, or simply,  BJP Mizoram (BJP;), 
is the state unit of the Bharatiya Janata Party of the Mizoram. Its head office is situated at the Venghlui, T/82, Aizawl-796 001, Mizoram, India.

In General Election

In State Election

In Local elections

Municipal corporation election results

Autonomous District Council election

See also
Buddha Dhan Chakma
Bharatiya Janata Party
National Democratic Alliance
North East Democratic Alliance
Mizo National Front
Zoram People's Movement
Organisation of the Bharatiya Janata Party

References

Political parties in Mizoram
Mizoram